The Corus Chess Tournament 2000 was the 62nd edition of the Corus Chess Tournament. It was held in Wijk aan Zee in January 2000 and was won for the second consecutive year by Garry Kasparov.

{| class="wikitable" style="text-align: center;"
|+ 62nd Corus Chess Tournament, group A, 15–30 January 2000, Wijk aan Zee, Cat. XVIII (2697)
! !! Player !! Rating !! 1 !! 2 !! 3 !! 4 !! 5 !! 6 !! 7 !! 8 !! 9 !! 10 !! 11 !! 12 !! 13 !! 14 !! Total !! TPR !! Place
|-
|-style="background:#ccffcc;"
| 1 || align=left| || 2851 ||  || ½ || ½ || ½ || 1 || ½ || ½ || 1 || 1 || ½ || 1 || 1 || ½ || 1 || 9½ || 2860 || 1
|-
| 2 || align="left" | || 2758 || ½ ||  || ½ || ½ || ½ || 1 || ½ || ½ || ½ || 1 || ½ || ½ || 1 || ½ || 8 || 2779 || 2–4
|-
| 3 || align="left" | || 2725 || ½ || ½ ||  || ½ || ½ || ½ || ½ || ½ || 1 || ½ || ½ || 1 || 1 || ½ || 8 || 2782 || 2–4
|-
| 4 || align="left" | || 2769 || ½ || ½ || ½ ||  || ½ || ½ || ½ || ½ || 1 || ½ || ½ || 1 || 1 || ½ || 8 || 2778 || 2–4
|-
| 5 || align="left" | || 2748 || 0 || ½ || ½ || ½ ||  || ½ || ½ || 0 || 1 || ½ || 1 || ½ || 1 || 1 || 7½ || 2750 || 5
|-
| 6 || align="left" | || 2715 || ½ || 0 || ½ || ½ || ½ ||  || ½ || 1 || 0 || 1 || ½ || ½ || ½ || 1 || 7 || 2725 || 6
|-
| 7 || align="left" | || 2633 || ½ || ½ || ½ || ½ || ½ || ½ ||  || 1 || 0 || 1 || 0 || 0 || 1 || ½ || 6½ || 2702 || 7–8
|-
| 8 || align="left" | || 2655 || 0 || ½ || ½ || ½ || 1 || 0 || 0 ||  || ½ || ½ || ½ || ½ || 1 || 1 || 6½ || 2700 || 7–8
|-
| 9 || align="left" | || 2659 || 0 || ½ || 0 || 0 || 0 || 1 || 1 || ½ ||  || ½ || ½ || 1 || ½ || ½ || 6 || 2671 || 9
|-
| 10 || align="left" | || 2683 || ½ || 0 || ½ || ½ || ½ || 0 || 0 || ½ || ½ ||  || 1 || ½ || ½ || ½ || 5½ || 2641 || 10
|-
| 11 || align="left" | || 2658 || 0 || ½ || ½ || ½ || 0 || ½ || 1 || ½ || ½ || 0 ||  || ½ || 0 || ½ || 5 || 2613 || 11–12
|- 
| 12 || align="left" | || 2659 || 0 || ½ || 0 || 0 || ½ || ½ || 1 || ½ || 0 || ½ || ½ ||  || 0 || 1 || 5 || 2613 || 11–12
|-
| 13 || align="left" | || 2605 || ½ || 0 || 0 || 0 || 0 || ½ || 0 || 0 || ½ || ½ || 1 || 1 ||  || ½ || 4½ || 2594 || 13
|-
| 14 || align="left" | || 2646 || 0 || ½ || ½ || ½ || 0 || 0 || ½ || 0 || ½ || ½ || ½ || 0 || ½ ||  || 4 || 2560 || 14
|}

{| class="wikitable" style="text-align: center;"
|+ 62nd Corus Chess Tournament, group B, 18–30 January 2000, Wijk aan Zee, Cat. XI (2507)
! !! Player !! Rating !! 1 !! 2 !! 3 !! 4 !! 5 !! 6 !! 7 !! 8 !! 9 !! 10 !! 11 !! 12 !! Total !! TPR !! Place
|-
| 1 || align=left| || 2567 ||  || ½ || 1 || ½ || 1 || 1 || ½ || ½ || 1 || 0 || 1 || 1 || 8 || 2676 || 1–3
|-
| 2 || align="left" | || 2637 || ½ ||  || ½ || ½ || 1 || ½ || 1 || ½ || ½ || 1 || 1 || 1 || 8 || 2669 || 1–3
|-
| 3 || align="left" | || 2620 || 0 || ½ ||  || 1 || ½ || 1 || ½ || 1 || ½ || 1 || 1 || 1 || 8 || 2671 || 1–3
|-
| 4 || align="left" | || 2611 || ½ || ½ || 0 ||  || ½ || 0 || ½ || 1 || 1 || ½ || 1 || 1 || 6½ || 2562 || 4–5
|-
| 5 || align="left" | || 2558 || 0 || 0 || ½ || ½ ||  || 0 || 1 || ½ || 1 || 1 || 1 || 1 || 6½ || 2566 || 4–5
|-
| 6 || align="left" | || 2561 || 0 || ½ || 0 || 1 || 1 ||  || 0 || 1 || ½ || 1 || ½ || ½ || 6 || 2537 || 6
|-
| 7 || align="left" | || 2540 || ½ || 0 || ½ || ½ || 0 || 1 ||  || 0 || 1 || 1 || 0 || 1 || 5½ || 2503 || 7–8
|-
| 8 || align="left" | || 2462 || ½ || ½ || 0 || 0 || ½ || 0 || 1 ||  || 1 || 1 || ½ || ½ || 5½ || 2510 || 7–8
|-
| 9 || align="left" | || 2499 || 0 || ½ || ½ || 0 || 0 || ½ || 0 || 0 ||  || ½ || 1 || ½ || 3½ || 2374 || 9–10
|-
| 10 || align="left" | || 2297 || 1 || 0 || 0 || ½ || 0 || 0 || 0 || 0 || ½ ||  || ½ || 1 || 3½ || 2392 || 9–10
|-
| 11 || align="left" | || 2373 || 0 || 0 || 0 || 0 || 0 || ½ || 1 || ½ || 0 || ½ ||  || ½ || 3 || 2343 || 11
|- 
| 12 || align="left" | || 2354 || 0 || 0 || 0 || 0 || 0 || ½ || 0 || ½ || ½ || 0 || ½ ||  || 2 || 2258 || 12
|}

 IM Manuel Bosboom (2461) won Reserve Group Swiss-system tournament with the score 7/9 and performance rating 2595.

References

Tata Steel Chess Tournament
2000 in chess
2000 in Dutch sport